Robert Alter (born 1935) is an American Hebrew and comparative literature scholar. 

Robert Alter may also refer to:

Robert Alter (hotelier) (born 1951), American hotelier